Mariusz Łukasz Wlazły (born 4 August 1983) is a Polish professional volleyball player. He was a member of the Poland national team from 2005 to 2014. A participant in the Olympic Games Beijing 2008, 2014 World Champion, and a nine–time Polish Champion with Skra Bełchatów. At the professional club level, he plays for Trefl Gdańsk.

Personal life
Mariusz Wlazły was born in Wieluń, Poland. On 17 June 2006, Mariusz married Paulina (née Drewicz). On 13 January 2009, his wife gave birth to their first child, a son named Arkadiusz. On 23 November 2015, their second son was born. In February 2017, he graduated from the Academy of Management and Administration in Opole with master's degree in sports marketing.

Career

Clubs
Wlazły played in Skra Bełchatów for over 10 years. During that time he won eight titles of the Polish Champion (2005, 2006, 2007, 2008, 2009, 2010, 2011, 2014). With PGE Skra, he won a bronze medal at the 2007–08 CEV Champions League, and was also individually awarded as the Best Spiker of the tournament. He won a bronze medal at the 2009–10 CEV Champions League, playing with Skra Bełchatów and was awarded as the Best Scorer. Mariusz win a silver medal and the Most Valuable Player award in the CEV Champions League 2011/2012. He has two silver medals from the Club World Championships in 2009 and 2010, and one bronze medal in 2012. In 2014, he won his 8th title of the Polish Champion with Skra. On 8 October 2014, his team won the Polish SuperCup . His club played in the Final four of the 2014–15 CEV Champions League, but lost in the semifinal to Asseco Resovia, and in a match for third place to Berlin Recycling Volleys, and did not achieve any medal. In May 2015, he signed a contract with Qatari club Al Arabi Doha for the duration of the Emir Cup (only 2 matches). All the money earned in Qatar, Mariusz Wlazły decided to transfer to his own foundation. On 7 February 2016, he won the Polish Cup after beating ZAKSA in the final.

National team
He was a member of the Polish national team, which won the title of the U21 World Champion. He made his debut in the senior national team during 2004 summer season and by FIVB World League 2005 he had already established himself as one of the most important players of the national team. In 2006, he won second place at the FIVB World Championship held in Japan. During that tournament he was nominated for the Most Valuable Player award, losing only to Brazilian star Giba. In 2010 he gave up playing for Polish national team because of a conflict with management.

On 8 April 2014, Wlazły was appointed to the Polish national team after 4 years of absence, by the head coach Stéphane Antiga. On 16 August 2014, he was appointed to the squad at the World Championship held in Poland. On 21 September 2014, Poland, including Wlazły, won a title of the World Champion. He received two individual awards for the Best Opposite Spiker and Most Valuable Player of the tournament. On the day of winning the gold medal, Wlazły announced his retirement from the national team. On 27 October 2014, he received a state award granted by the Polish President Bronisław Komorowski – Officer's Cross of Polonia Restituta for outstanding sports achievements, and promotion of Poland in the world.

Honours

Clubs
 CEV Champions League
  2011/2012 – with PGE Skra Bełchatów

 FIVB Club World Championship
  Doha 2009 – with PGE Skra Bełchatów
  Doha 2010 – with PGE Skra Bełchatów

 National championships
 2004/2005  Polish Cup, with Skra Bełchatów
 2004/2005  Polish Championship, with Skra Bełchatów
 2005/2006  Polish Cup, with BOT Skra Bełchatów
 2005/2006  Polish Championship, with BOT Skra Bełchatów
 2006/2007  Polish Cup, with BOT Skra Bełchatów
 2006/2007  Polish Championship, with BOT Skra Bełchatów
 2007/2008  Polish Championship, with PGE Skra Bełchatów
 2008/2009  Polish Cup, with PGE Skra Bełchatów
 2008/2009  Polish Championship, with PGE Skra Bełchatów
 2009/2010  Polish Championship, with PGE Skra Bełchatów
 2010/2011  Polish Cup, with PGE Skra Bełchatów
 2010/2011  Polish Championship, with PGE Skra Bełchatów
 2011/2012  Polish Cup, with PGE Skra Bełchatów
 2012/2013  Polish SuperCup, with PGE Skra Bełchatów
 2013/2014  Polish Championship, with PGE Skra Bełchatów
 2014/2015  Polish SuperCup, with PGE Skra Bełchatów
 2015/2016  Polish Cup, with PGE Skra Bełchatów
 2017/2018  Polish SuperCup, with PGE Skra Bełchatów
 2017/2018  Polish Championship, with PGE Skra Bełchatów
 2018/2019  Polish SuperCup, with PGE Skra Bełchatów

Youth national team
 2003  FIVB U21 World Championship

Individual awards
 2004: Polish Cup – Best Spiker
 2006: Polish Cup – Best Spiker
 2007: Polish Cup – Best Spiker
 2008: CEV Champions League – Best Spiker
 2009: Polish Cup – Best Spiker
 2009: Polish Cup – Most Valuable Player
 2010: CEV Champions League – Best Scorer
 2011: Polish Cup – Best Server
 2011: Polish Cup – Most Valuable Player
 2012: Polish Cup – Best Server
 2012: CEV Champions League – Most Valuable Player
 2012: Polish SuperCup – Most Valuable Player
 2014: FIVB World Championship – Best Opposite Spiker
 2014: FIVB World Championship – Most Valuable Player
 2015: Best Athlete in the World in 2014 (according to SportAccord)
 2016: Polish Cup – Best Opposite Spiker
 2016: Polish Cup – Most Valuable Player

State awards
 2006:  Gold Cross of Merit
 2014:  Officer's Cross of Polonia Restituta

References

External links

 
 Player profile at PlusLiga.pl 
 Player Profile at Volleybox.net
 
 

1983 births
Living people
People from Wieluń
Sportspeople from Łódź Voivodeship
Polish men's volleyball players
Polish Champions of men's volleyball
Olympic volleyball players of Poland
Volleyball players at the 2008 Summer Olympics
Recipients of the Gold Cross of Merit (Poland)
Officers of the Order of Polonia Restituta
Polish expatriate sportspeople in Qatar
Expatriate volleyball players in Qatar
Skra Bełchatów players
Trefl Gdańsk players
Opposite hitters
Outside hitters